Thomas James Wright (born 29 August 1963) is a Northern Irish football coach and former player who was most recently the manager of Kilmarnock.

As a player, he was a goalkeeper who notably played in the Premier League with Nottingham Forest, Newcastle United and Manchester City. He also played in the Football League with Hull City, Reading and Wrexham, as well as in his native country with Linfield. He was capped 31 times by Northern Ireland.

Since retiring as a player he has worked as a coach or manager for Limavady United, Ballymena United, Shamrock Rovers and St Johnstone. He guided St Johnstone to their win in the 2014 Scottish Cup Final, which won the first major national trophy in their history; he left his role there in May 2020. Wright was appointed Kilmarnock manager in February 2021, but was sacked in December of that year.

Club career
Wright was born in Ballyclare. After playing in his native Northern Ireland until he was 25, he entered English football with Newcastle United in the 1988–89 season and had a spell as first choice goalkeeper after Dave Beasant was sold to Chelsea in January 1989, but Newcastle went down to the Second Division that season.

After losing his place to Pavel Srnicek in the early 1990s, he eventually moved to Nottingham Forest where he went straight into the starting line-up, however after an injury absence he failed to regain his place from Mark Crossley. He also saw relatively little first team action in later spells at Manchester City and a number of clubs where he played on loan. Early in the 1999–2000, he returned to Newcastle on a loan deal and played for them three times.

Injuries blighted his playing career, and he found dislodging other goalkeepers, once he regained fitness, difficult or impossible.

International career
Wright won 31 caps for Northern Ireland in a ten-year period from 1989 to 1999. The high point of his Northern Ireland career was his performance in Nuremberg in 1996, as Northern Ireland earned a 1–1 draw against reigning European champions, Germany, in a 1998 FIFA World Cup qualification match. Wright had not played an international match in over two years prior to that point and had just returned to club action, on loan at Reading, after a prolonged injury absence.

Managerial career
Wright was first a goalkeeping coach for Norwich City but left when Glenn Roeder resigned. He was then appointed Youth Development Officer at Ballyclare Comrades. In November 2003 he made his first move into management at Limavady United and stayed for a couple of years. Wright was then appointed manager of Ballymena United and reached the County Antrim Shield against Linfield at Seaview. Wright resigned at the end of the 2007–08 season.

He was a full-time goalkeeping coach at Shamrock Rovers for the 2009 League of Ireland season under his former teammate Michael O'Neill. In September 2009 he was appointed manager of Lisburn Distillery. His first game was against his former club Ballymena United, which Lisburn won by a single goal.

St Johnstone
Wright left Distillery in November 2011 to become assistant manager of Scottish Premier League club St Johnstone.

After Steve Lomas left the Perth club to manage Millwall in June 2013, Wright was promoted to manager. Wright's first game in charge was a UEFA Europa League tie in Norway against Rosenborg. St Johnstone won 1–0, their first-ever away victory in European competition. The second leg ended in a 1–1 draw, putting St Johnstone through 2–1 on aggregate, and through to the third round of the qualifying stages for the first time. Despite winning 1–0 win against Minsk in the first leg of the next round, they went on to lose on penalties. After the match, Wright criticised Minsk, believing they lacked class in victory. After winning two games and drawing once in October, Wright won the Scottish Premiership Manager of the Month award.

In March 2014, Wright was involved in a touchline incident with Dundee United manager Jackie McNamara. This resulted a one-match ban for Wright. A few days later, Wright was taken to hospital after suffering stomach pains. Despite being in the hospital, Wright was still involved in the squad selection ahead of a match against Hibernian. The operation was a success, and Wright made his return in a match against Partick Thistle.

After Wright led the club to a top-six position in the Premiership, he guided them to their first Scottish Cup Final after a 2–1 win over Aberdeen. They were victorious in the 17 May, Final meeting with Dundee United at Celtic Park. It was St Johnstone's first major trophy win. Wright signed a new contract with St Johnstone in August 2014. He signed another contract with St Johnstone in October 2015, soon after the club had rejected an approach from Dundee United for Wright.

He was voted Premiership Manager of the Season for the 2015–16 season, leading St Johnstone to another fourth-place finish and a third domestic cup semi-final, losing out to Hibernian.

St Johnstone secured a third successive fourth-place finish in the Premiership in 2016–17 under Wright, with two games remaining, also qualifying for Europe again.

Wright resigned as St Johnstone manager on 2 May 2020.

Kilmarnock
Wright was appointed Kilmarnock manager on 8 February 2021. Kilmarnock finished the 2020–21 Scottish Premiership in 11th place, and were then relegated to the Championship after they lost a play-off to Dundee. Wright was sacked by Kilmarnock in December 2021, with the club sitting in 5th place in the Championship.

Media work
Wright from time to time does co-commentary work for BBC Northern Ireland's football coverage as well as some punditry work for BT Sport's Scottish football coverage.

Managerial statistics

 Kilmarnock statistics include Scottish League Cup forfeit defeat to East Kilbride on 16th July 2021 (ineligible player in original tie in which Kilmarnock won).

Honours and achievements

As a player
Newcastle United
Football League Division One: 1992–93

Bolton Wanderers
Football League Division One play-offs: 2000–01

As a manager
Lisburn Distillery
Irish League Cup: 2010–11

St Johnstone
Scottish Cup: 2013–14

References

External links

1963 births
Association football goalkeepers
Association footballers from Northern Ireland
Ballymena United F.C. managers
Bolton Wanderers F.C. players
Football managers from Northern Ireland
Hull City A.F.C. players
Kilmarnock F.C. managers
Linfield F.C. players
Lisburn Distillery F.C. managers
Living people
Manchester City F.C. players
Newcastle United F.C. players
NIFL Premiership players
Northern Ireland international footballers
Norwich City F.C. non-playing staff
Nottingham Forest F.C. players
People educated at Ballyclare High School
People from Ballyclare
Premier League players
Reading F.C. players
Scottish Professional Football League managers
St Johnstone F.C. managers
St Johnstone F.C. non-playing staff
English Football League players
Wrexham A.F.C. players